Ziyad Kashmiri (born 27 June 1969) is a Saudi Arabian swimmer. He competed in two events at the 1992 Summer Olympics.

References

1969 births
Living people
Saudi Arabian male swimmers
Olympic swimmers of Saudi Arabia
Swimmers at the 1992 Summer Olympics
Place of birth missing (living people)
20th-century Saudi Arabian people